Anhanguera may refer to:

People
 Bartolomeu Bueno da Silva (1672–1740), a bandeirante

Places in Brazil
 Anhanguera, Goiás, a municipality in the state of Goiás
 Anhanguera (district of São Paulo), a district in São Paulo
 Parque Anhanguera, a municipal park in São Paulo
 Rede Anhanguera de Comunicação (RAC), a mass communication company from Campinas
 Rodovia Anhanguera, a highway in the state of São Paulo

Other meanings
Anhanguera (devil), in Brazilian mythology
 Anhanguera (pterosaur)
 Anhanguera Educacional, an educational company
 CDT da Anhanguera, a television production facility